Ivory Coast competed at the 1968 Summer Olympics in Mexico City, Mexico under the IOC country code CML due to the Ivory Coast in Spanish being Costa de Marfil.

Results by event

Athletics
Men's 100 metres
 Gaoussou Kone
 Round 1 — 10.3 s (→ 3rd in heat, advanced to round 2)
 Round 2 — 10.2 s (→ 3rd in heat, advanced to semi final)
 Semi final — 10.2 s (→ 5th in heat, did not advance)

Men's 400 metres
 Coulibaly Yoyaga
 Round 1 — 50.0 s (→ 8th in heat, did not advance)

Men's 100 metres hurdles
 Simbara Maki
 Round 1 — 14.3 s (→ 6th in heat, did not advance)

Men's 4x100 metres relay
 Atta Kouaukou
 N'Dri Kouame
 Boy Diby
 Gaoussou Kone
 Round 1 — 39.6 seconds (→ 5th in heat, advanced to semi final)
 Semi final — 39.6 seconds (→ 5th in heat, did not advance)

Men's discus throw
 Segui Kragbe
 Round 1 — 55.24 m (→ did not advance)

Canoeing
Men's K-1 1000 metres
 Jérôme Dogo Gaye
 Heats — 4:31.2 min (→ 7th in heat, advanced to repechage)
 Repechage — 4:31.69 min (→ 4th in heat, did not advance)

Men's K-2 1000 metres
 Paul Gnamia and N'Gama N'Gama
 Heats — 3:50.8 min (→ 5th in heat, advanced to repechage)
 Repechage — 4:07.98 min (→ 3rd in heat, advanced to semi final)
 Semi final — 4:01.31 min (→ 5th in heat, did not advance)

References

External links
 

Nations at the 1968 Summer Olympics
1968
1968 in Ivory Coast